Elephant Destiny: Biography Of An Endangered Species In Africa is a 2009 non-fiction book by Martin Meredith published by Public Affairs. It discusses the African elephant, its risk of extinction, and its interwoven history with Africa's development, dating to the time of the pharaohs.

References

External links

2009 non-fiction books
Books about elephants
PublicAffairs books